Doumen station can refer to:
Doumen station (Fuzhou Metro), a station on Line 1 (Fuzhou Metro)
 , a station on Line 3 (Nanchang Metro)
Doumen station (Xi'an Metro), a station on Line 5 (Xi'an Metro)